Wolfgang Klapf (born 14 December 1978) is an Austrian football player who plays for Union Weißkirchen.

External links
Player profile - FC Magna
National Football Teams

1978 births
Living people
People from Leoben
Austrian footballers
Association football defenders
DSV Leoben players
LASK players
SC Wiener Neustadt players
Austrian Football Bundesliga players
Footballers from Styria